The 1999 Qatar Crown Prince Cup was the 5th edition of this cup tournament in men's football (soccer). It was played by the top four teams of the Q-League.

Al-Wakrah were crowned champions for the first time.

Results

Qatar Crown Prince Cup
1998–99 in Qatari football